The Bakersfield Californian is a daily newspaper serving Bakersfield, California and surrounding Kern County in the state's San Joaquin Valley.

History

The Bakersfield Californian is the direct descendant of Kern County's first newspaper, The Weekly Courier, which was first published on Aug. 18, 1866, in Havilah, California. At that time, Havilah, a small mining town about 50 miles northeast of the present site of Bakersfield, was the center of the 1864 gold rush, which brought the first major population influx to Kern County. The newspaper's name was later changed to The Havilah Weekly Courier.

As the mineral wealth of the area became depleted and the population moved southward toward Bakersfield, the newspaper also moved to Bakersfield in 1872, becoming The Kern County Weekly Courier. In 1876, the Courier merged with another Bakersfield newspaper, The Southern Californian, to form The Kern County Californian. Its name was changed to The Daily Californian in 1891 with the advent of daily publication. In 1897, the Kern County superintendent of schools, Alfred Harrell, purchased the newspaper.

Harrell gave The Bakersfield Californian its present name in 1907. In 1926, he moved the newspaper to 1707 Eye St. in downtown Bakersfield. In 1983, that structure was placed on the National Register of Historic Places. He served as editor and publisher of the newspaper until his death in 1946. Under Harrell's leadership, The Bakersfield Californian was recognized as one of California's finest newspapers, winning over 40 state and national awards for journalistic excellence. In 1969, Harrell became the 24th person to be named to the Newspaper Hall of Fame.

After Harrell's death, his wife, Virginia, became president of The Californian. She held that position until her death in 1954, when the Harrells' daughter, Bernice Harrell Chipman, assumed the position of president. She died in 1967.

Berenice Fritts Koerber, granddaughter of Alfred Harrell, was the president of The Bakersfield Californian from 1967 until her death in 1988. Under her leadership, the company constructed a $21 million publishing facility in 1984. It is named the Harrell-Fritts Publishing Center and is located at a business center near Meadows Field.

In January 1989, Virginia F. Moorhouse, daughter of Berenice Koerber, was elected chairman and president of The Bakersfield Californian.

On August 17, 2009, the weekday editions of The Californian switched to a tabloid format.

In December 2014, Virginia "Ginny" Cowenhoven, daughter of Virginia F. "Ginger" Moorhouse, was named associate publisher, the fifth generation of the Harrell-Fritts family to serve in a leadership position at the media company.

On June 3, 2019, after 122 years of family ownership, the paper announced a deal with Canadian newspaper executive Steven Malkowitz to sell the paper to Sound News Media. The sale closed on July 1, whereupon printing operations in Bakersfield ceased and were moved to Antelope Valley, where Sound News Media owns the Antelope Valley Press. The Harrell-Fritts family retained ownership of The Harrell-Fritts Printing Press Building located at 3700 Pegasus Drive and The Historic Californian building at 1707 Eye St. With the sale on July 1, 2019, the newspaper returned to a broadsheet format seven days a week.

Other publications
The Bakersfield Californian publishes several other publications in Kern County including the Tehachapi News, Kern Business Journal, Bakersfield Life Magazine and the Delano Record  serving Delano and McFarland.

Awards
In 2020, The Bakersfield Californian earned first-place general excellence honors in the 2019 California Journalism Awards, recognizing the entire newsroom staff for its reporting and writing, photography, design and overall presentation. The judges said The Californian offered "clean design, good use of typography. Great sense of place, and personality carries throughout."

It was one of 18 honors the newspaper received in the contest put on by the California News Publishers Association. The awards were announced online as the association decided to forgo its traditional May gala in the wake of the COVID-19 pandemic.

Also in 2020, The Californian earned honors in seven of seven categories in the 32nd annual George F. Gruner Awards, recognizing excellence in Central Valley print journalism. Meanwhile, the Tehachapi News also captured honors in five of the seven divisions.

In 2004, the paper received the Payne Award for Ethics in Journalism for Robert Price's January 2003 "Lords of Bakersfield" stories, which focused on the stabbing death of Assistant District Attorney Steven Tauzer and similar crimes committed over the previous 25 years, some of which reflected negatively on the newspaper's ownership and management. The articles were also recognized with California Newspaper Publishers Association and George F. Gruner awards, and publisher Ginger Moorhouse was named Publisher of the Year by Editor & Publisher magazine.

References

External links
The Bakersfield Californian Online
Tehachapi News Online
Kern Business Journal Online
Bakersfield Life Magazine Online
The Record Online

Daily newspapers published in California
Mass media in Bakersfield, California
Mass media in Kern County, California
Publications established in 1866
1866 establishments in California